Nanooravia is a monotypic genus of flowering plants belonging to the family Poaceae. The only species is Nanooravia santapaui.

Its native range is Southern India.

References

Poaceae
Monotypic Poaceae genera